This is a list of current and former Roman Catholic churches in the Roman Catholic Archdiocese of Milwaukee. The archdiocese included 195 churches (as of May 2020), covering the following 10 Wisconsin counties: Dodge, Fond du Lac, Kenosha, Milwaukee, Ozaukee, Racine, Sheboygan, Walworth, Washington, and Waukesha. The cathedral church of the archdiocese is the Cathedral of St. John the Evangelist in Milwaukee.

Milwaukee

Fond du Lac

Kenosha

Racine

Sheboygan

Waukesha

Wauwatosa

West Allis

Other areas

References

 
Milwaukee